Storvatnet, Storavatnet, or Storevatnet are variants of the Norwegian word for "big lake".  It may refer to:

Places
Storvatnet (Averøy), a lake in Averøy municipality in Møre og Romsdal county, Norway
Storvatnet (Ballangen), a lake in Ballangen municipality in Nordland county, Norway
Storvatnet (Bykle), a lake in Bykle municipality in Agder county, Norway
Storvatnet (Indre Fosen), a lake in Indre Fosen municipality in Trøndelag county, Norway
Storvatnet (Nærøy), a lake in Nærøysund municipality in Trøndelag county, Norway
Storavatnet, a lake in Bergen municipality in Vestland county, Norway
Storavatnet or Byrkjelandsvatnet, a lake in Bjerkreim municipality in Rogaland county, Norway